Charles L. Daniels (July 1, 1861 – February 9, 1938), was a Major League Baseball pitcher who played in  with the Boston Reds.

He was born in Roxbury, Massachusetts and died in Boston, Massachusetts.

External links

1861 births
1938 deaths
Major League Baseball pitchers
Baseball players from Massachusetts
Boston Reds (UA) players
19th-century baseball players
Lawrence (minor league baseball) players